The 2017 election, resulted in Kasper Olesen from the Social Democrats becoming mayor, but not without drama. The election resulted in both the Social Democrats and the Conservatives winning 7 seats. This was while Venstre who had held the mayor's position in the period up to the election, only won 3 seats. They tried to have a majority behind them holding the mayor's position once again, however without luck. After many days of negotiations, they eventually opted for supporting Kasper Olesen for mayor. This was untraditional, since Conservatives and Venstre are in the same political bloc.

Because of the dramatic and uncommon result, and that the Conservatives were having great opinion polls nationwide, it was speculated that they would have a good chance to win the mayor's position this time. Conservatives and Venstre were part of an electoral alliance with the New Right and Danish People's Party. This suggested that they would be ready to give one of them the mayor's position, if a majority was won.

In the result, both the Social Democrats and Conservatives would increase their vote share by more than 10%, and would gain 3 and 2 seats respectively. A majority in the electoral alliance mentioned above was won. However Danish People's Party would drop it's support to a mayor from the blue bloc, and suddenly Kasper Olesen would once again have an untraditional majority behind him, being the Social Democrats, the Green Left, Danish People's Party and the Red–Green Alliance.

Electoral system
For elections to Danish municipalities, a number varying from 9 to 31 are chosen to be elected to the municipal council. The seats are then allocated using the D'Hondt method and a closed list proportional representation.
Kerteminde Municipality had 25 seats in 2021

Unlike in Danish General Elections, in elections to municipal councils, electoral alliances are allowed.

Electoral alliances  

Electoral Alliance 1

Electoral Alliance 2

Electoral Alliance 3

Results

Notes

References 

Kerteminde